Communauté d'agglomération Territoires Vendômois is the communauté d'agglomération, an intercommunal structure, centred on the town of Vendôme. It is located in the Loir-et-Cher department, in the Centre-Val de Loire region, central France. Created in 2017, its seat is in Vendôme. Its area is 1,039.6 km2. Its population was 52,836 in 2019, of which 15,856 in Vendôme proper.

Composition
The communauté d'agglomération consists of the following 65 communes:

Ambloy
Areines
Artins
Authon
Azé
Bonneveau
Cellé
Coulommiers-la-Tour
Crucheray
Danzé
Épuisay
Les Essarts
Faye
Fontaine-les-Coteaux
Fortan
Gombergean
Les Hayes
Houssay
Huisseau-en-Beauce
Lancé
Lavardin
Lunay
Marcilly-en-Beauce
Mazangé
Meslay
Montoire-sur-le-Loir
Montrouveau
Naveil
Nourray
Périgny
Pray
Prunay-Cassereau
Rahart
Rocé
Les Roches-l'Évêque
Saint-Amand-Longpré
Saint-Arnoult
Sainte-Anne
Saint-Firmin-des-Prés
Saint-Gourgon
Saint-Jacques-des-Guérets
Saint-Martin-des-Bois
Saint-Ouen
Saint-Rimay
Sasnières
Savigny-sur-Braye
Selommes
Sougé
Ternay
Thoré-la-Rochette
Tourailles
Troo
Vallée-de-Ronsard
Vendôme
La Ville-aux-Clercs
Villavard
Villechauve
Villedieu-le-Château
Villemardy
Villeporcher
Villerable
Villeromain
Villetrun
Villiersfaux
Villiers-sur-Loir

References

Vendome
Vendome